Barbara-Rose Collins (née Richardson; April 13, 1939 – November 4, 2021) was an American politician from the U.S. state of Michigan and the first black woman from Michigan to be elected to Congress.

Life and career
Collins was born as Barbara-Rose Richardson in Detroit, Michigan, the daughter of Lou Versa (Jones) and Lamar Nathaniel Richardson, a Ford Motor Co. employee. She is an alumnus of Cass Technical High School in Detroit, Michigan. She attended Cass Technical High School in 1957. She earned a Bachelor of Arts degree in Political Science and Anthropology from Wayne State University.

In 1960, Barbara-Rose Collins became divorced and a single mom. Barbara-Rose Collins worked multiple jobs and had public assistance until beginning a position as a Business Manager at Wayne State University. She worked as a Business Manager for the Physics department at Wayne State University for 9 years.

After hearing a speech by Black activist Stokely Carmichael at Detroit's Shrine of the Black Madonna Church in the late 1960s, Barbara-Rose Collins became inspired by the speech to pursue a career in activism to uplift communities. Later, she was supported by the pastor of the Shrine Church to pursue a career in state legislature. She ran for a seat in 1974.

During her early campaign days in 1974, Barbara-Rose Collins changed her name from Barbara Rose to Barbara-Rose making her first and middle name hyphenated. She did so to distinguish herself from other candidates. This change made her known as the congresswoman Barbara-Rose Collins from then on forward.

Collins was a member of the Detroit Public School Board from 1971 to 1973, the Michigan House of Representatives for the 21st district from 1975 to 1981, and the Detroit City Council from 1982 to 1991. During her time on the Detroit Public School Board, she earned recognition for her "school safety and academic achievement."

In 1988, she lost a primary election to the incumbent U.S. representative for what was then Michigan's 13th congressional district, George W. Crockett, Jr. When he retired, she won the seat, taking 34 percent of the vote in a crowded eight-way Democratic primary. This was tantamount to election in this heavily Democratic, black-majority district. She won handily in November and was reelected three more times, each time garnering over 80 percent of the vote. Her district was renumbered as the 15th district after the 1990 census.

Collins was a sponsor of several bills that passed into law, including the Food Dating Bill, the Sex Education Bill, and the Pregnancy Insurance Bill. She also introduced the Unrenumerated Work Act in 1991, 1993, and 1994. This bill would have required the Bureau of Labor Statistics to set value on unwaged work such as housework, care work, agricultural work, volunteer work, and work in a family business, and include that value in the Gross National Product of the United States. This measure had been called for in the Forward Looking Strategies resolution passed at the World Conference on Women, 1985. Collins's bill was endorsed by the Congressional Caucus for Women's Issues and by 1993 had 90 co-sponsors; however, it failed to pass.

Collins was the subject of a United States House Committee on Ethics inquiry in 1995, under suspicion of 11 instances of misuse of funds. In 1996, after she lost the Democratic primary for re-election to Carolyn Cheeks Kilpatrick, the inquiry was dropped. After five years out of politics, Collins returned to the Detroit City Council in 2001. She was re-elected in 2005 and retired in 2009.

Juneteenth 
Barbara-Rose Collins can be credited with proposing a bill to make Juneteenth a federal holiday back in 1996. According to the ACLU of Michigan, "Michigan's own Congresswoman Barbara Rose Collins introduced a bill in 1996 that petitioned the U.S. government to make Juneteenth a federal holiday.  In her congressional remarks, she stated, "the dehumanizing and degrading conditions of slavery were unnecessarily prolonged for hundreds of thousands of black men, women, and children, because our American government failed to communicate the truth" (2017). Because of Barbara-Rose Collins and her efforts back in 1996, Juneteenth is now a federal holiday since 2021.

Death 
Collins died from COVID-19 at a Detroit hospital on November 4, 2021, at age 82, during the COVID-19 pandemic in Michigan. According to her son, she had been vaccinated with the Janssen COVID-19 vaccine. According to one of her grandsons, Collins had health issues that contributed to her COVID-19 death despite her vaccination status.

Personal life 
Collins was the aunt of actor and comedian Sam Richardson.

See also
List of African-American United States representatives
List of federal political scandals in the United States
Women in the United States House of Representatives

References

External links

1939 births
2021 deaths
African-American state legislators in Michigan
African-American women in politics
African-American members of the United States House of Representatives
Democratic Party members of the Michigan House of Representatives
Wayne State University alumni
Female members of the United States House of Representatives
Detroit City Council members
Deaths from the COVID-19 pandemic in Michigan
School board members in Michigan
Women state legislators in Michigan
Democratic Party members of the United States House of Representatives from Michigan
Women city councillors in Michigan
21st-century American women politicians
20th-century American women politicians
20th-century American politicians
20th-century African-American women
20th-century African-American people
21st-century African-American women
21st-century African-American people
21st-century American politicians